Cayley is a hamlet in southern Alberta, Canada within the Foothills County. It is also recognized as a designated place by Statistics Canada.

It is located within Census Division No. 6.

History 
The community was named for the Hon. Hugh St. Quentin Cayley, a barrister and the publisher of the Calgary Herald in 1884, who also represented Calgary in the Northwest Territories legislature from 1886 to 1894. The hamlet originally contained at least seven grain elevators; all have been demolished. Cayley is also home to a Hutterite colony and a colony school; in 2001, two Cayley Colony girls were the first students from an Alberta colony school to write provincial diploma exams and graduate from high school.

Incorporation history 
Previously incorporated as a village on August 4, 1904, Cayley dissolved to hamlet status on June 1, 1996.

Demographics 

See also 
List of communities in Alberta
List of designated places in Alberta
List of former urban municipalities in Alberta
List of hamlets in Alberta

References 

Hamlets in Alberta
Calgary Region
Designated places in Alberta
Foothills County
Former villages in Alberta
Populated places disestablished in 1996